Mikkel Elbjørn Larsen (born 15 August 1989 in Hvidovre) is a Danish badminton player. Larsen started playing badminton at aged 4 at Kastrup-Magleby Badminton Klub (KMB). In 2006–2007 season, he won the mixed doubles title at the Danish National U-19 Championships, and in 2007–2008 season, he retain the title and also won the boys' doubles title. In 2007, he won the bronze medals at the European Junior Championships in the mixed doubles and team event.

Achievements

European Junior Championships
Mixed doubles

BWF International Challenge/Series
Men's doubles

 BWF International Challenge tournament
 BWF International Series tournament
 BWF Future Series tournament

References

External links
 

1989 births
Living people
People from Hvidovre Municipality
Danish male badminton players
Sportspeople from the Capital Region of Denmark